Salinator fragilis is a species of small, air-breathing land snail with an operculum, a pulmonate gastropod mollusc in the family Amphibolidae. The species is sometimes referred to as the fragile air breather.  It was originally described as being in the genus Ampullaria, but was split off into the genus Salinator in 1900 by Charles Hedley.

Distribution
This species lives on the coast of Australia and also in Melanesia. The species also reported from mangrove ecosystems of India i.e. Sunderbans, Kakinada bay and Mumbai.

Habitat
This snail lives in salt-marshes, estuaries and mangrove ecosystems.

Diet
This species feeds on detritus.

References

 Golding R.E., Ponder W.F. & Byrne M. 2007. Taxonomy and anatomy of Amphiboloidea (Gastropoda: Heterobranchia: Archaeopulmonata). Zootaxa 1476: 1-50 page(s): 10

Amphibolidae
Taxa named by Jean-Baptiste Lamarck
Gastropods described in 1822